Thomas Glacier is a glacier in northern Greenland. Administratively it belongs to the Northeast Greenland National Park.

The glacier was named by Robert Peary after E. B. Thomas, one of the founding members of the Peary Arctic Club in New York.

Geography 
The Thomas Glacier is a large, slow-moving glacier in Roosevelt Land. It flows northwestwards with its terminus at the head of the Hunt Fjord. 

In the area of its terminus sharp-peaked, dark nunataks protrude above the ice.

See also
List of glaciers in Greenland
Peary Land

References

External links
North Greenland Glacier Velocities and Calf Ice Production
Glaciers of Greenland
Roosevelt Range